A Girl in Exile: Requiem for Linda B. (Albanian: E penguara: Rekuiem për Linda B.) is a novel by Albanian author Ismail Kadare. It has been described as "one of Kadare's best novels".

Originally published in Albanian in 2009, the English translation by John Hodgson came out in 2016.

Footnotes

2009 novels
21st-century Albanian novels
Novels by Ismail Kadare
Novels set in Albania
Onufri Publishing House books